Onychophora  (from , , "claws"; and , , "to carry"), commonly known as velvet worms (due to their velvety texture and somewhat wormlike appearance) or more ambiguously as peripatus  (after the first described genus, Peripatus), is a phylum of elongate, soft-bodied, many-legged panarthropods. In appearance they have variously been compared to worms with legs, caterpillars, and slugs. They prey upon other invertebrates, which they catch by ejecting an adhesive slime. Approximately 200 species of velvet worms have been described, although the true number of species is likely greater. The two extant families of velvet worms are Peripatidae and Peripatopsidae. They show a peculiar distribution, with the peripatids being predominantly equatorial and tropical, while the peripatopsids are all found south of the equator. It is the only phylum within Animalia that is wholly endemic to terrestrial environments, at least among extant members. Velvet worms are generally considered close relatives of the Arthropoda and Tardigrada, with which they form the proposed taxon Panarthropoda. This makes them of palaeontological interest, as they can help reconstruct the ancestral arthropod. In modern zoology they are particularly renowned for their curious mating behaviours and the bearing of live young in some species.

Anatomy
Velvet worms are segmented animals with a flattened cylindrical body cross-section and rows of unstructured body appendages known as oncopods or lobopods (informally: stub feet). They grow to between 0.5 and 20 cm (.2 to 8 in), with the average being about 5 cm (2  in). The number of leg pairs ranges from as few as 13 (in Ooperipatellus nanus) to as many as 43 (in Plicatoperipatus jamaicensis). Their skin consists of numerous, fine transverse rings and is often inconspicuously coloured orange, red or brown, but sometimes also bright green, blue, gold or white, and occasionally patterned with other colours. Segmentation is outwardly inconspicuous, and identifiable by the regular spacing of the pairs of legs and in the regular arrangement of skin pores, excretion organs and concentrations of nerve cells. The individual body sections are largely unspecialised; even the head develops only a little differently from the abdominal segments. Segmentation is apparently specified by the same gene as in other groups of animals, and is activated in each case, during embryonic development, at the rear border of each segment and in the growth zone of the stub feet. Although onychophorans fall within the protostome group, their early development has a deuterostome trajectory, (with the mouth and anus forming separately); this trajectory is concealed by the rather sophisticated processes which occur in early development.

Appendages
The stub feet that characterise the velvet worms are conical, baggy appendages of the body, which are internally hollow and have no joints. Although the number of feet can vary considerably between species, their structure is basically very similar. Rigidity is provided by the hydrostatic pressure of their fluid contents, and movement is usually obtained passively by stretching and contraction of the animal's entire body. However, each leg can also be shortened and bent by internal muscles. Due to the lack of joints, this bending can take place at any point along the sides of the leg. In some species, two different organs are found within the feet:

Crural glands are situated at the shoulder of the legs, extending into the body cavity. They open outwards at the crural papillae—small wart-like bumps on the belly side of the leg—and secrete chemical messenger materials called pheromones. Their name comes from the Latin cruralis meaning "of the legs".
Coxal vesicles are pouches located on the belly side of the leg, which can be everted and probably serve in water absorption.

At the base of the claws are three to six spiny "cushions" on which the leg sits in its resting position and on which the animal walks over smooth substrates. The claws are used mainly to gain a firm foothold on uneven terrain. Each claw is composed of three stacked elements, like Russian nesting dolls. The outermost is shed during ecdysis, which exposes the next element in — which is fully formed, so does not need time to harden before it is used. (This distinctive construction identifies many early Cambrian fossils as early offshoots of the onychophoran lineage.) Apart from the pairs of legs, there are three further body appendages, which are at the head and comprise three segments:

 On the first head segment is a pair of slender antennae, which serve in sensory perception. They probably do not correspond directly to the antennae of the Arthropoda, but perhaps rather with their "lips" or labrum. At their base is found a pair of simple eyes, except in a few blind species. In front of these, in many Australian species, are various dimples, the function of which is not yet clear. It appears that in at least some species, these serve in the transfer of sperm-cell packages (spermatophores).
 On the belly side of the second head segment is the labrum, a mouth opening surrounded by sensitive "lips". In the velvet worms, this structure is a muscular outgrowth of the throat, so, despite its name, it is probably not homologous to the labrum of the Arthropoda and is used for feeding. Deep within the oral cavity lie the sharp, crescent-shaped "jaws", or mandibles, which are strongly hardened and resemble the claws of the feet, with which they are serially homologous; early in development, the jaw appendages have a position and shape similar to the subsequent legs. The jaws are divided into internal and external mandibles and their concave surface bears fine denticles. They move backward and forward in a longitudinal direction, tearing apart the prey, apparently moved in one direction by musculature and the other by hydrostatic pressure.  The claws are made of sclerotised α-chitin, reinforced with phenols and quinones, and have a uniform composition – except that there is a higher concentration of calcium towards the tip, presumably affording greater strength.

The surface of the mandibles is smooth, with no ornamentation. The cuticle in the mandibles (and claws) is distinct from the rest of the body. It has an inner and outer component; the outer component has just two layers (whereas body cuticle has four), and these outer layers (in particular the inner epicuticle) are dehydrated and strongly tanned, affording toughness.

Slime glands
On the third head segment, to the left and right of the mouth, are two openings designated "oral papillae". Within these are a pair of large, heavily internally branched slime glands. These lie roughly in the centre of the body and secrete a sort of milky-white slime, which is used to ensnare prey and for defensive purposes. Sometimes the connecting "slime conductor" is broadened into a reservoir, which can buffer pre-produced slime. The slime glands themselves are probably modified crural glands. All three structures correspond to an evolutionary origin in the leg pairs of the other segments.

Skin and muscle
Unlike the arthropods, velvet worms do not possess a rigid exoskeleton. Instead, their fluid-filled body cavity acts as a hydrostatic skeleton, similarly to many distantly related soft-bodied animals that are cylindrically shaped, for example sea anemones and various worms. Pressure of their incompressible internal bodily fluid on the body wall provides rigidity, and muscles are able to act against it. The body wall consists of a non-cellular outer skin, the cuticula; a single layer of epidermis cells forming an internal skin; and beneath this, usually three layers of muscle, which are embedded in connective tissues. The cuticula is about a micrometer thick and covered with fine villi. In composition and structure, it resembles the cuticula of the arthropods, consisting of α-chitin and various proteins, although not containing collagen. It can be divided into an external epicuticula and an internal procuticula, which themselves consist of exo- and endo-cuticula. This multi-level structure is responsible for the high flexibility of the outer skin, which enables the velvet worm to squeeze itself into the narrowest crevices. Although outwardly water-repellent, the cuticula is not able to prevent water loss by respiration, and, as a result, velvet worms can live only in microclimates with high humidity to avoid desiccation. The surface of the cuticula is scattered with numerous fine papillae, the larger of which carry visible villi-like sensitive bristles. The papillae themselves are covered with tiny scales, lending the skin a velvety appearance (from which the common name is likely derived). It also feels like dry velvet to the touch, for which its water-repellent nature is responsible. Moulting of the skin (ecdysis) takes place regularly, around every 14 days, induced by the hormone ecdysone. The inner surface of the skin bears a hexagonal pattern. At each moult, the shed skin is replaced by the epidermis, which lies immediately beneath it; unlike the cuticula, this consists of living cells. Beneath this lies a thick layer of connective tissue, which is composed primarily of collagen fibres aligned either parallel or perpendicular to the body's longitudinal axis. The colouration of Onychophora is generated by a range of pigments. The solubility of these pigments is a useful diagnostic character: in all arthropods and tardigrades, the body pigment is soluble in ethanol. This is also true for the Peripatidae, but in the case of the Peripatopsidae, the body pigment is insoluble in ethanol.

Within the connective tissue lie three continuous layers of unspecialised smooth muscular tissue. The relatively thick outer layer is composed of annular muscles, and the similarly voluminous inner layer of longitudinal muscles. Between them lie thin diagonal muscles that wind backward and forward along the body axis in a spiral. Between the annular and diagonal muscles exist fine blood vessels, which lie below the superficially recognisable transverse rings of the skin and are responsible for the pseudo-segmented markings. Beneath the internal muscle layer lies the body cavity. In cross-section, this is divided into three regions by so-called dorso-ventral muscles, which run from the middle of the underbelly through to the edges of the upper side: a central midsection and on the left and right, two side regions that also include the legs.

Circulation
The body cavity is known as a "pseudocoel", or haemocoel. Unlike a true coelom, a pseudocoel is not fully enclosed by a cell layer derived from the embryonic mesoderm. A coelom is, however, formed around the gonads and the waste-eliminating nephridia. As the name haemocoel suggests, the body cavity is filled with a blood-like liquid in which all the organs are embedded; in this way, they can be easily supplied with nutrients circulating in the blood. This liquid is colourless as it does not contain pigments; for this reason, it serves only a limited role in oxygen transport.
Two different types of blood cells (or haemocytes) circulate in the fluid: Amoebocytes and nephrocytes. The amoebocytes probably function in protection from bacteria and other foreign bodies; in some species, they also play a role in reproduction. Nephrocytes absorb toxins or convert them into a form suitable for elimination by the nephridia.

The haemocoel is divided by a horizontal partition, the diaphragm, into two parts: The pericardial sinus along the back and the perivisceral sinus along the belly. The former encloses the tube-like heart, and the latter, the other organs. The diaphragm is perforated in many places, enabling the exchange of fluids between the two cavities. The heart itself is a tube of annular muscles consisting of epithelial tissues, with two lateral openings (ostia) per segment. While it is not known whether the rear end is open or closed, from the front, it opens directly into the body cavity.

Since there are no blood vessels, apart from the fine vessels running between the muscle layers of the body wall and a pair of arteries that supply the antennae, this is referred to as an open circulation. The timing of the pumping procedure can be divided into two parts: Diastole and systole. During diastole, blood flows through the ostia from the pericardial sinus (the cavity containing the heart) into the heart. When the systole begins, the ostia close and the heart muscles contract inwards, reducing the volume of the heart. This pumps the blood from the front end of the heart into the perivisceral sinus containing the organs. In this way, the various organs are supplied with nutrients before the blood finally returns to the pericardial sinus via the perforations in the diaphragm. In addition to the pumping action of the heart, body movements also influence circulation.

Respiration
Oxygen uptake occurs to an extent via simple diffusion through the entire body surface, with the coxal vesicles on the legs possibly being involved in some species. However, of most importance is gas exchange via fine unbranched tubes, the tracheae, which draw oxygen from the surface deep into the various organs, particularly the heart.

The walls of these structures, which are less than three micrometers thick in their entirety, consist only of an extremely thin membrane through which oxygen can easily diffuse. The tracheae originate at tiny openings, the spiracles, which themselves are clustered together in dent-like recesses of the outer skin, the atria. The number of "tracheae bundles" thus formed is on average around 75 bundles per body segment; they accumulate most densely on the back of the organism.

Unlike the arthropods, the velvet worms are unable to control the openings of their tracheae; the tracheae are always open, entailing considerable water loss in arid conditions. Water is lost twice as fast as in earthworms and forty times faster than in caterpillars. For this reason, velvet worms are dependent upon habitats with high air humidity.

Digestion
The digestive tract begins slightly behind the head, the mouth lying on the underside a little way from the frontmost point of the body. Here, prey can be mechanically dismembered by the mandibles with their covering of fine toothlets. Two salivary glands discharge via a common conductor into the subsequent "throat", which makes up the first part of the front intestine. The saliva that they produce contains mucus and hydrolytic enzymes, which initiate digestion in and outside the mouth.

The throat itself is very muscular, serving to absorb the partially liquified food and to pump it, via the oesophagus, which forms the rear part of the front intestine, into the central intestine. Unlike the front intestine, this is not lined with a cuticula but instead consists only of a single layer of epithelial tissue, which does not exhibit conspicuous indentation as is found in other animals.

On entering the central intestine, food particles are coated with a mucus-based peritrophic membrane, which serves to protect the lining of the intestine from damage by sharp-edged particles. The intestinal epithelium secretes further digestive enzymes and absorbs the released nutrients, although the majority of digestion has already taken place externally or in the mouth. Indigestible remnants arrive in the rear intestine, or rectum, which is once again lined with a cuticula and which opens at the anus, located on the underside near to the rear end.

In almost every segment is a pair of excretory organs called nephridia, which are derived from coelom tissue. Each consists of a small pouch that is connected, via a flagellated conductor called a nephridioduct, to an opening at the base of the nearest leg known as a nephridiopore. The pouch is occupied by special cells called podocytes, which facilitate ultrafiltration of the blood through the partition between haemocoelom and nephridium.

The composition of the urinary solution is modified in the nephridioduct by selective recovery of nutrients and water and by isolation of poison and waste materials, before it is excreted to the outside world via the nephridiopore. The most important nitrogenous excretion product is the water-insoluble uric acid; this can be excreted in solid state, with very little water. This so-called uricotelic excretory mode represents an adjustment to life on land and the associated necessity of dealing economically with water.

A pair of former nephridia in the head were converted secondarily into the salivary glands, while another pair in the final segment of male specimens now serve as glands that apparently play a role in reproduction.

Sensation
The entire body, including the stub feet, is littered with numerous papillae: warty protrusions responsive to touch that carry a mechanoreceptive bristle at the tip, each of which is also connected to further sensory nerve cells lying beneath. The mouth papillae, the exits of the slime glands, probably also have some function in sensory perception. Sensory cells known as "sensills" on the "lips" or labrum respond to chemical stimuli and are known as chemoreceptors. These are also found on the two antennae, which seem to be the velvet worm's most important sensory organs.

Except in a few (typically subterranean) species, one simply constructed eye (ocellus) lies behind each antenna, laterally, just underneath the head. This consists of a chitinous ball lens, a cornea and a retina and is connected to the centre of the brain via an optic nerve. The retina comprises numerous pigment cells and photoreceptors; the latter are easily modified flagellated cells, whose flagellum membranes carry a photosensitive pigment on their surface.

The rhabdomeric eyes of the Onychophora are thought to be homologous with the median ocelli of arthropods; this would suggest that the last common ancestor of arthropods may have only had median ocelli.
However, the innervation shows that the homology is limited: The eyes of Onychophora form behind the antenna, whereas the opposite is true in arthropods.

Reproduction
Both sexes possess pairs of gonads, opening via a channel called a gonoduct into a common genital opening, the gonopore, which is located on the rear ventral side. Both the gonads and the gonoduct are derived from true coelom tissue.

In females, the two ovaries are joined in the middle and to the horizontal diaphragm. The gonoduct appears differently depending on whether the species is live-bearing or egg-laying. In live-bearing species, each exit channel divides into a slender oviduct and a roomy "womb", the uterus, in which the embryos develop. The single vagina, to which both uteri are connected, runs outward to the gonopore. In egg-laying species, whose gonoduct is uniformly constructed, the genital opening lies at the tip of a long egg-laying apparatus, the ovipositor. The females of many species also possess a sperm repository called the receptacle seminis, in which sperm cells from males can be stored temporarily or for longer periods.

Males possess two separate testes, along with the corresponding sperm vesicle (the vesicula seminalis) and exit channel (the vasa efferentia). The two vasa efferentia unite to a common sperm duct, the vas deferens, which in turn widens through the ejaculatory channel to open at the gonopore. Directly beside or behind this lie two pairs of special glands, which probably serve some auxiliary reproductive function; the rearmost glands are also known as anal glands. A penis-like structure has so far been found only in males of the genus Paraperipatus but has not yet been observed in action.

There are different mating procedures: In some species males deposit their spermatophore directly into the female's genitals opening, while others deposit it on the female's body, where the cuticle will collapse and allowing the sperm cells to migrate into the female. There are also Australian species where the male place their spermatophore on top of their head, which is then pressed against the female's genitals. In these species the head have elaborate structures like spikes, spines, hollow stylets, pits, and depressions, whose purpose is to either hold the sperm and / or assist in the sperm transfer to the female. The males of most species also secrete a pheromone from glands on the underside of the legs to attract females.

Distribution and habitat

Distribution
Velvet worms live in all tropical habitats and in the temperate zone of the Southern Hemisphere, showing a circumtropical and circumaustral distribution. Individual species are found in Central and South America; the Caribbean islands; equatorial West Africa and Southern Africa; northeastern India; Thailand; Indonesia and parts of Malaysia; New Guinea; Australia; and New Zealand.

Fossils have been found in Baltic amber, indicating that they were formerly more widespread in the Northern Hemisphere when conditions were more suitable.

Habitat
Velvet worms always sparsely occupy the habitats where they are found: They are rare among the fauna which they are a part of.

All extant velvet worms are terrestrial (land-living) and prefer dark environments with high air humidity. They are found particularly in the rainforests of the tropics and temperate zones, where they live among moss cushions and leaf litter, under tree trunks and stones, in rotting wood or in termite tunnels. They also occur in unforested grassland, if there exist sufficient crevices in the soil into which they can withdraw during the day, and in caves. Two species live in caves, a habitat to which their ability to squeeze themselves into the smallest cracks makes them exceptionally well-adapted and in which constant living conditions are guaranteed. Since the essential requirements for cave life were probably already present prior to the settlement of these habitats, this may be described as exaptation.

Some species of velvet worms are able to occupy human-modified land-uses, such as cocoa and banana plantations in South America and the Caribbean, but for others, conversion of rainforests is likely one of the most important threats to their survival (see Conservation).

Velvet worms are photophobic: They are repelled by bright light sources. Because the danger of desiccation is greatest during the day and in dry weather, it is not surprising that velvet worms are usually most active at night and during rainy weather. Under cold or dry conditions, they actively seek out crevices in which they shift their body into a resting state.

Slime
The Onychophora forcefully squirt glue-like slime from their oral papillae; they do so either in defense against predators or to capture prey. The openings of the glands that produce the slime are in the papillae, a pair of highly modified limbs on the sides of the head below the antennae. Inside, they have a syringe-like system that, by a geometric amplifier, allows for fast squirt using slow muscular contraction. The interplay between the elasticity of oral papillae and the fast unsteady flow produces a passive oscillatory motion (30–60 Hz) of the oral papillae. The oscillation causes the streams to cross in mid air, weaving a disordered net; the velvet worms can control only the general direction where the net is thrown.

The slime glands themselves are deep inside the body cavity, each at the end of a tube more than half the length of the body. The tube both conducts the fluid and stores it until it is required. The distance that the animal can propel the slime varies; usually it squirts it about a centimetre, but the maximal range has variously been reported to be ten centimetres, or even nearly a foot, although accuracy drops with range. It is not clear to what extent the range varies with the species and other factors. One squirt usually suffices to snare a prey item, although larger prey may be further immobilised by smaller squirts targeted at the limbs; additionally, the fangs of spiders are sometimes targeted. Upon ejection, it forms a net of threads about twenty microns in diameter, with evenly spaced droplets of viscous adhesive fluid along their length. It subsequently dries, shrinking, losing its stickiness, and becoming brittle. Onychophora eat their dried slime when they can, which is appropriate, because it takes an onychophoran about 24 days to replenish an exhausted slime repository.

The slime can account for up to 11% of the organism's dry weight and is 90% water; its dry residue consists mainly of proteins — primarily a collagen-type protein. 1.3% of the slime's dry weight consists of sugars, mainly galactosamine. The slime also contains lipids and the surfactant nonylphenol. Onychophora are the only organisms known to produce this latter substance. It tastes "slightly bitter and at the same time somewhat astringent". The proteinaceous composition accounts for the slime's high tensile strength and stretchiness. The lipid and nonylphenol constituents may serve one of two purposes. They may line the ejection channel, stopping the slime from sticking to the organism when it is secreted; or they may slow the drying process long enough for the slime to reach its target.

Behaviour

Locomotion

Velvet worms/Onychophora move in a slow and gradual motion that makes them difficult for prey to notice. Their trunk is raised relatively high above the ground, and they walk with non-overlapping steps.
To move from place to place, the velvet worm crawls forward using its legs; unlike in arthropods, both legs of a pair are moved simultaneously. The claws of the feet are used only on hard, rough terrain where a firm grip is needed; on soft substrates, such as moss, the velvet worm walks on the foot cushions at the base of the claws.

Actual locomotion is achieved less by the exertion of the leg muscles than by local changes of body length. This can be controlled using the annular and longitudinal muscles. If the annular muscles are contracted, the body cross-section is reduced, and the corresponding segment lengthens; this is the usual mode of operation of the hydrostatic skeleton as also employed by other worms. Due to the stretching, the legs of the segment concerned are lifted and swung forward. Local contraction of the longitudinal muscles then shortens the appropriate segment, and the legs, which are now in contact with the ground, are moved to the rear. This part of the locomotive cycle is the actual leg stroke that is responsible for forward movement. The individual stretches and contractions of the segments are coordinated by the nervous system such that contraction waves run the length of the body, each pair of legs swinging forward and then down and rearward in succession. Macroperipatus can reach speeds of up to four centimetres per second, although speeds of around 6 body-lengths per minute are more typical. The body gets longer and narrower as the animal picks up speed; the length of each leg also varies during each stride.

Sociality
The brains of Onychophora, though small, are very complex; consequently, the organisms are capable of rather sophisticated social interactions. Behaviour may vary from genus to genus, so this article reflects the most-studied genus, Euperipatoides.

The Euperipatoides form social groups of up to fifteen individuals, usually closely related, which will typically live and hunt together. Groups usually live together; in drier regions an example of a shared home would be the moist interior of a rotting log. Group members are extremely aggressive towards individuals from other logs. Dominance is achieved through aggression and maintained through submissive behaviour. After a kill, the dominant female always feeds first, followed in turn by the other females, then males, then the young.

When assessing other individuals, individuals often measure one another up by running their antennae down the length of the other individual. Once hierarchy has been established, pairs of individuals will often cluster together to form an "aggregate"; this is fastest in male-female pairings, followed by pairs of females, then pairs of males.

Social hierarchy is established by a number of interactions: Higher-ranking individuals will chase and bite their subordinates while the latter are trying to crawl on top of them. Juveniles never engage in aggressive behaviour, but climb on top of adults, which tolerate their presence on their backs.
Hierarchy is quickly established among individuals from a single group, but not among organisms from different groups; these are substantially more aggressive and very rarely climb one another or form aggregates. Individuals within an individual log are usually closely related; especially so with males. This may be related to the intense aggression between unrelated females.

Feeding
Velvet worms are ambush predators, hunting only by night, and are able to capture animals at least their own size, although capturing a large prey item may take almost all of their mucus-secreting capacity. They feed on almost any small invertebrates, including woodlice (Isopoda), termites (Isoptera), crickets (Gryllidae), book/bark lice (Psocoptera), cockroaches (Blattidae), millipedes and centipedes (Myriapoda), spiders (Araneae), various worms, and even large snails (Gastropoda). Depending on their size, they eat on average every one to four weeks. They are considered to be ecologically equivalent to centipedes (Chilopoda). The most energetically favourable prey are two-fifths the size of the hunting onychophoran. Ninety percent of the time involved in eating prey is spent ingesting it; re-ingestion of the slime used to trap the insect is performed while the onychophoran locates a suitable place to puncture the prey, and this phase accounts for around 8% of the feeding time, with the remaining time evenly split between examining, squirting, and injecting the prey.  In some cases, chunks of the prey item are bitten off and swallowed; undigestable components take around 18 hours to pass through the digestive tract. Onychophora probably do not primarily use vision to detect their prey; although their tiny eyes do have a good image-forming capacity, their forward vision is obscured by their antennae; their nocturnal habit also limits the utility of eyesight. Air currents, formed by prey motion, are thought to be the primary mode of locating prey; the role of scent, if any, is unclear. Because it takes so long to ingest a prey item, hunting mainly happens around dusk; the onychophorans will abandon their prey at sunrise. This predatory way of life is probably a consequence of the velvet worm's need to remain moist. Due to the continual risk of desiccation, often only a few hours per day are available for finding food. This leads to a strong selection for a low cost-benefit ratio, which cannot be achieved with a herbivorous diet.

Velvet worms literally creep up on their prey, with their smooth, gradual and fluid movement escaping detection. Once they reach their prey, they touch it very softly with their antennae to assess its size and nutritional value. After each poke, the antenna is hastily retracted to avoid alerting the prey. This investigation may last anywhere upwards of ten seconds, until the velvet worm makes a decision as to whether to attack it, or until it disturbs the prey and the prey flees. Hungry Onychophora spend less time investigating their prey and are quicker to apply their slime. Once slime has been squirted, Onychophora are determined to pursue and devour their prey, in order to recoup the energy investment. They have been observed to spend up to ten minutes searching for removed prey, after which they return to their slime to eat it. In the case of smaller prey, they may opt not to use slime at all. Subsequently, a soft part of the prey item (usually a joint membrane in arthropod prey) is identified, punctured with a bite from the jaws, and injected with saliva. This kills the prey very quickly and begins a slower process of digestion. While the onychophoran waits for the prey to digest, it salivates on its slime and begins to eat it (and anything attached to it). It subsequently tugs and slices at the earlier perforation to allow access to the now-liquefied interior of its prey.  The jaws operate by moving backwards and forwards along the axis of the body (not in a side-to-side clipping motion as in arthropods), conceivably using a pairing of musculature and hydrostatic pressure. The pharynx is specially adapted for sucking, to extract the liquefied tissue; the arrangement of the jaws about the tongue and lip papillae ensures a tight seal and the establishment of suction. In social groups, the dominant female is the first to feed, not permitting competitors access to the prey item for the first hour of feeding. Subsequently, subordinate individuals begin to feed. The number of males reaches a peak after females start to leave the prey item. After feeding, individuals clean their antennae and mouth parts before re-joining the rest of their group.

Reproduction and life-cycle
Almost all species of velvet worm reproduce sexually. The sole exception is Epiperipatus imthurni, of which no males have been observed; reproduction instead occurs by parthenogenesis. All species are in principle sexually distinct and bear, in many cases, a marked sexual dimorphism: the females are usually larger than the males and have, in species where the number of legs is variable, more legs. The females of many species are fertilized only once during their lives, which leads to copulation sometimes taking place before the reproductive organs of the females are fully developed. In such cases, for example at the age of three months in Macroperipatus torquatus, the transferred sperm cells are kept in a special reservoir, where they can remain viable for longer periods. Fertilization takes place internally, although the mode of sperm transmission varies widely. In most species, for example in the genus Peripatus, a package of sperm cells called the spermatophore is placed into the genital opening of the female. The detailed process by which this is achieved is in most cases still unknown, a true penis having been observed only in species of the genus Paraperipatus. In many Australian species, there exist dimples or special dagger- or axe-shaped structures on the head; the male of Florelliceps stutchburyae presses a long spine against the female's genital opening and probably positions its spermatophore there in this way. During the process, the female supports the male by keeping him clasped with the claws of her last pair of legs. The mating behavior of two species of the genus Peripatopsis is particularly curious. Here, the male places two-millimetre spermatophores on the back or sides of the female. Amoebocytes from the female's blood collect on the inside of the deposition site, and both the spermatophore's casing and the body wall on which it rests are decomposed via the secretion of enzymes. This releases the sperm cells, which then move freely through the haemocoel, penetrate the external wall of the ovaries and finally fertilize the ova. Why this self-inflicted skin injury does not lead to bacterial infections is not yet understood (though likely related to the enzymes used to deteriorate the skin or facilitate the transfer of viable genetic material from male to female). Velvet worms are found in egg-laying (oviparous), egg-live-bearing (ovoviviparous) and live-bearing (viviparous) forms.

Ovipary occurs solely in the Peripatopsidae, often in regions with erratic food supply or unsettled climate. In these cases, the yolk-rich eggs measure 1.3 to 2.0 mm and are coated in a protective chitinous shell. Maternal care is unknown.
The majority of species are ovoviviparous: the medium-sized eggs, encased only by a double membrane, remain in the uterus. The embryos do not receive food directly from the mother, but are supplied instead by the moderate quantity of yolk contained in the eggs—they are therefore described as lecithotrophic. The young emerge from the eggs only a short time before birth. This probably represents the velvet worm's original mode of reproduction, i.e., both oviparous and viviparous species developed from ovoviviparous species.
True live-bearing species are found in both families, particularly in tropical regions with a stable climate and regular food supply throughout the year. The embryos develop from eggs only micrometres in size and are nourished in the uterus by their mother, hence the description "matrotrophic". The supply of food takes place either via a secretion from the mother directly into the uterus or via a genuine tissue connection between the epithelium of the uterus and the developing embryo, known as a placenta. The former is found only outside the American continents, while the latter occurs primarily in America and the Caribbean and more rarely in the Old World. The gestation period can amount to up to 15 months, at the end of which the offspring emerge in an advanced stage of development. The embryos found in the uterus of a single female do not necessarily have to be of the same age; it is quite possible for there to be offspring at different stages of development and descended from different males. In some species, young tend to be released only at certain points in the year.

A female can have between 1 and 23 offspring per year; development from fertilized ovum to adult takes between 6 and 17 months and does not have a larval stage. This is probably also the original mode of development. Velvet worms have been known to live for up to six years.

Ecology
The velvet worm's important predators are primarily various spiders and centipedes, along with rodents and birds, such as, in Central America, the clay-coloured thrush (Turdus grayi). In South America, Hemprichi's coral snake (Micrurus hemprichii) feeds almost exclusively on velvet worms. For defence, some species roll themselves reflexively into a spiral, while they can also fight off smaller opponents by ejecting slime. Various mites (Acari) are known to be ectoparasites infesting the skin of the velvet worm. Skin injuries are usually accompanied by bacterial infections, which are almost always fatal.

The South African species Peripatopsis capensis has been inadvertently introduced to Santa Cruz Island in the Galapagos Islands, where it co-occurs with native velvet worms.

Conservation
The global conservation status of velvet worm species is difficult to estimate; many species are only known to exist at their type locality (the location at which they were first observed and described). The collection of reliable data is also hindered by low population densities, their typically nocturnal behaviour and possibly also as-yet undocumented seasonal influences and sexual dimorphism. To date, the only onychophorans evaluated by the IUCN are: 
Mesoperipatus tholloni (Data Deficient)
Plicatoperipatus jamaicensis (Near Threatened)
Peripatoides indigo (Vulnerable)
Peripatoides suteri (Vulnerable)
Peripatopsis alba (Vulnerable)
Peripatopsis clavigera (Vulnerable)
Macroperipatus insularis (Endangered)
Leucopatus anophthalmus (Endangered)
Opisthopatus roseus (Critically Endangered)
Peripatopsis leonina (Critically Endangered)
Speleoperipatus spelaeus (Critically Endangered) 

The primary threat comes from destruction and fragmentation of velvet worm habitat due to industrialisation, draining of wetlands, and slash-and-burn agriculture. Many species also have naturally low population densities and closely restricted geographic ranges; as a result, relatively small localised disturbances of important ecosystems can lead to the extinction of entire populations or species. Collection of specimens for universities or research institutes also plays a role on a local scale. There is a very pronounced difference in the protection afforded to velvet worms between regions: in some countries, such as South Africa, there are restrictions on both collecting and exporting, while in others, such as Australia, only export restrictions exist. Many countries offer no specific safeguards at all. Tasmania has a protection programme that is unique worldwide: one region of forest has its own velvet worm conservation plan, which is tailored to a particular velvet worm species.

Phylogeny

In their present forms, the velvet worms are probably very closely related to the arthropods, a very extensive taxon that incorporates, for instance, the crustaceans, insects, and arachnids. They share, among other things, an exoskeleton consisting of α-chitin and non-collagenous proteins; gonads and waste-elimination organs enclosed in true coelom tissue; an open blood system with a tubular heart situated at the rear; an abdominal cavity divided into pericardial and perivisceral cavities; respiration via tracheae; and similar embryonic development. Segmentation, with two body appendages per segment, is also a shared feature.

However, the antennae, mandibles, and oral papillae of velvet worms are probably not homologous to the corresponding features in arthropods; i.e., they probably developed independently.

Another closely related group are the comparatively obscure water bears (Tardigrada); however, due to their very small size, water bears have no need for – and hence lack – blood circulation and separate respiratory structures: shared characteristics that support common ancestry of velvet worms and arthropods.

Together, the velvet worms, arthropods, and water bears form a monophyletic taxon, the Panarthropoda, i.e., the three groups collectively cover all descendants of their last common ancestor. Due to certain similarities of form, the velvet worms were usually grouped with the water bears to form the taxon Protoarthropoda. This designation would imply that both velvet worms and water bears are not yet as highly developed as the arthropods. Modern systematic theories reject such conceptions of "primitive" and "highly developed" organisms and instead consider exclusively the historical relationships among the taxa. These relationships are not as yet fully understood, but it is considered probable that the velvet worms' sister groups form a taxon designated Tactopoda, thus:

For a long time, velvet worms were also considered related to the annelids. They share, among other things, a worm-like body; a thin and flexible outer skin; a layered musculature; paired waste-elimination organs; as well as a simply constructed brain and simple eyes. Decisive, however, was the existence of segmentation in both groups, with the segments showing only minor specialisation. The parapodia appendages found in annelids therefore correspond to the stump feet of the velvet worms. Within the Articulata hypothesis developed by Georges Cuvier, the velvet worms therefore formed an evolutionary link between the annelids and the arthropods: worm-like precursors first developed parapodia, which then developed further into stub feet as an intermediate link in the ultimate development of the arthropods' appendages. Due to their structural conservatism, the velvet worms were thus considered "living fossils". This perspective was expressed paradigmatically in the statement by the French zoologist A. Vandel:

Onychophorans can be considered highly evolved annelids, adapted to terrestrial life, which announced prophetically the Arthropoda. They are a lateral branch which has endured from ancient times until today, without important modifications.

Modern taxonomy does not study criteria such as "higher" and "lower" states of development or distinctions between "main" and "side" branches—only family relationships indicated by cladistic methods are considered relevant. From this point of view, several common characteristics still support the Articulata hypothesis — segmented body; paired appendages on each segment; pairwise arrangement of waste-elimination organs in each segment; and above all, a rope-ladder-like nervous system based on a double nerve strand lying along the belly. An alternative concept, most widely accepted today, is the so-called Ecdysozoa hypothesis. This places the annelids and Panarthropoda in two very different groups: the former in the Lophotrochozoa and the latter in the Ecdysozoa. Mitochondrial gene sequences also provide support for this hypothesis. Proponents of this hypothesis assume that the aforementioned similarities between annelids and velvet worms either developed convergently or were primitive characteristics passed unchanged from a common ancestor to both the Lophotrochozoa and Ecdysozoa. For example, in the first case, the rope-ladder nervous system would have developed in the two groups independently, while in the second case, it is a very old characteristic, which does not imply a particularly close relationship between the annelids and Panarthropoda. The Ecdysozoa concept divides the taxon into two, the Panarthropoda into which the velvet worms are placed, and the sister group Cycloneuralia, containing the threadworms (Nematoda), horsehair worms (Nematomorpha) and three rather obscure groups: the mud dragons (Kinorhyncha); penis worms (Priapulida); and brush-heads (Loricifera).

Particularly characteristic of the Cycloneuralia is a ring of "circumoral" nerves around the mouth opening, which the proponents of the Ecdysozoa hypothesis also recognise in modified form in the details of the nerve patterns of the Panarthropoda. Both groups also share a common skin-shedding mechanism (ecdysis) and molecular biological similarities. One problem of the Ecdysozoa hypothesis is the velvet worms' subterminal position of their mouths: Unlike in the Cycloneuralia, the mouth is not at the front end of the body, but lies further back, under the belly. However, investigations into their developmental biology, particularly regarding the development of the head nerves, suggest that this was not always the case, and that the mouth was originally terminal (situated at the tip of the body). This is supported by the fossil record.

The "stem-group arthropod" hypothesis is very widely accepted, but some trees suggest that the onychophorans may occupy a different position; their brain anatomy is more closely related to that of the chelicerates than to any other arthropod. The modern velvet worms form a monophyletic group, incorporating all the descendants of their common ancestor. Important common derivative characteristics (synapomorphies) include, for example, the mandibles of the second body segment and the oral papillae and associated slime glands of the third; nerve strands extending along the underside with numerous cross-linkages per segment; and the special form of the tracheae. By 2011, some 180 modern species, comprising 49 genera, had been described; the actual number of species is probably about twice this. According to more recent study, 82 species of Peripatidae and 115 species of Peripatopsidae have been described thus far. However, among the 197 species, 20 are nomina dubia, due to major taxonomic inconsistencies. The best-known is the type genus Peripatus, which was described as early as 1825 and which, in English-speaking countries, stands representative for all velvet worms. All genera are assigned to one of two families, the distribution ranges of which do not overlap but are separated by arid areas or oceans:
 The Peripatopsidae exhibit relatively many characteristics that are perceived as original or "primitive". The number of leg pairs in this family range from 13 (in Ooperipatellus nanus) to 29 (in Paraperipatus papuensis). Behind or between the last leg pair is the genital opening (gonopore). Both oviparous and ovoviviparous, as well as genuinely viviparous, species exist, although the peripatopsids essentially lack a placenta. Their distribution is circumaustral, encompassing Australasia, South Africa, and Chile.
 The Peripatidae exhibit a range of derivative features. They are longer, on average, than the Peripatopsidae and also have more legs. The number of leg pairs in this family range from 19 (in Typhloperipatus williamsoni) to 43 (in Plicatoperipatus jamaicensis). The gonopore is always between the penultimate leg pair. None of the peripatid species are oviparous, and the overwhelming majority are viviparous. The females of many viviparous species develop a placenta with which to provide the growing embryo with nutrients. Distribution of the peripatids is restricted to the tropical and subtropical zones; in particular, they inhabit Central America, northern South America, Gabon, Northeast India, and Southeast Asia.

Evolution

Certain fossils from the early Cambrian bear a striking resemblance to the velvet worms. These fossils, known collectively as the lobopodians, were marine and represent a grade from which arthropods, tardigrades, and Onychophora arose.<ref name="Cite doi|10.1038/nature13576">{{Cite journal | doi = 10.1038/nature13576 | pmid = 25132546 | journal = Nature | volume = 514 | issue = 7522 | pages = 363–366 | last1 = Smith | first1 = M. R.  | title = Hallucigenia'''s onychophoran-like claws and the case for Tactopoda | last2 = Ortega Hernández | first2 = J. | url = http://rdcu.be/bKoD| year = 2014 | bibcode = 2014Natur.514..363S | s2cid = 205239797 }}</ref>
Onychophorans are found in the Cambrian, Ordovician (possibly), Silurian and Pennsylvanian periods.

Historically, all fossil Onychophora and lobopods were lumped into the taxon Xenusia, further subdivided by some authors to the Paleozoic Udeonychophora and the Mesozoic/Tertiary Ontonychophora; living Onychophora were termed Euonychophora. Importantly, few of the Cambrian fossils bear features that distinctively unite them with the Onychophora; none can be confidently assigned to the onychophoran crown or even stem group. The exceptions are Hallucigenia and related taxa such as Collinsium ciliosum, which bear distinctly onychophoran-like claws. It is not clear when the transition to a terrestrial existence was made, but it is considered plausible that it took place between the Ordovician and late Silurian—approximately —via the intertidal zone.

The low preservation potential of the non-mineralised Onychophora means that they have a sparse fossil record. Stem-group members include Helenodora (Carboniferous), Tertiapatus dominicanus, and Succinipatopsis balticus (Tertiary). A Carboniferous fossil from Montceau-les-Mines, France, Antennipatus possesses clear onychophoran affinities, but its preservation prohibits differentiating between its placement on the stem or crown of the two extant families, or on the onychophoran stem-group. However, some of these amber-borne specimens lack slime papillae and separate feet, and thus may belong in the stem group.

The vagaries of the preservation process can make fossils difficult to interpret. Experiments on the decay and compaction of onychophora demonstrate difficulties in interpreting fossils; certain parts of living onychophora are visible only in certain conditions:
 The mouth may or may not be preserved;
 The claws may be re-oriented or lost;
 The leg width may increase or decrease; and
 The mud may be mistaken for organs.
More significantly, features seen in fossils may be artefacts of the preservation process: For instance, "shoulder pads" may simply be the second row of legs coaxially compressed onto the body; branching "antennae" may in fact be produced through decay.

References

External links

 Flickr
 
 Youtube, The Slimy, Deadly Velvet Worm, Smithsonian Channel
 
Peripatus discussed on RNZ Critter of the Week'', 13 Nov 2015

Animal phyla
Taxa named by Adolph Eduard Grube